Liselotte Schaak (born 27 October 1908, date of death unknown) was a German actress, who appeared in more than thirty films during the Weimar and Nazi eras. She starred in the 1930 film Sabotage.

Selected filmography
 Rivals for the World Record (1930)
 Alraune (1930)
 Dance Into Happiness (1930)
 Sabotage (1930)
 The Battle of Bademunde (1931)
 The Emperor's Sweetheart (1931)
 The Mad Bomberg (1932)
 A Tremendously Rich Man (1932)
 An Auto and No Money (1932)
 My Friend the Millionaire (1932)
 Paprika (1932)
 The Four Musketeers (1934)
 Fanny Elssler (1937)
The Secret Lie (1938)
 Friedemann Bach (1941)
 The Golden Spider (1943)
 The Eternal Tone (1943)

References

Bibliography 
 Hodges, Graham Russell Gao. Anna May Wong: From Laundryman's Daughter to Hollywood Legend. Hong Kong University Press, 2012.

External links 
 

1908 births
German film actresses
20th-century German actresses
Year of death missing